Electoral registration may refer to:

Voter registration
Electoral roll
Electoral registration in the United Kingdom
Electoral registration officer